Thomas Langdon (died c. 1433), of Canterbury, Kent, was an English politician.

Family
Langdon was married and had one daughter. Neither of their names are recorded. His brother was John Langdon, bishop of Rochester.

Career
He was a Member (MP) of the Parliament of England for Canterbury in December 1421.

References

Year of birth missing
1433 deaths
English MPs December 1421
People from Canterbury